Farrish is a surname. People with the surname include:

 Dave Farrish (born 1956), Canadian ice hockey player
 Linn Farrish (1901–1944), American rugby union player and alleged spy
 William Farrish (1835–1920), American politician

See also
 Farish (disambiguation)
 Farris (disambiguation)